Great North Road is a major thoroughfare in Auckland, in the North Island of New Zealand. It runs from the fringe of the Auckland CBD to West Auckland. The road is the second longest in Auckland, after its counterpart, Great South Road, and is named after the Great North Road in Britain. In the days before the Auckland Harbour Bridge, Northern Motorway and Northwestern Motorway were built, it was the main road route from central Auckland to the areas north of the Auckland isthmus. In the 1960s, it carried 25,000–30,000 vehicles a day.

It begins as a continuation of Karangahape Road from the latter's terminus with Ponsonby Road and Newton Road, and passes through the western suburbs of Arch Hill, Grey Lynn, Western Springs, Point Chevalier, Waterview, Avondale, New Lynn, Kelston, Glendene and Henderson before becoming Swanson Road at the intersection with Lincoln Road. Contrary to its name, the road actually heads west for most of its route, turning to a more north-westerly direction at Kelston.

Located on or within walking distance from Great North Road are notable Auckland attractions such as the Museum of Transport and Technology and Auckland Zoo, as well as two major shopping malls, LynnMall and Westfield WestCity. The road is served by several bus routes linking Auckland with these attractions and the suburbs of west Auckland.

Major intersections

References 

Streets in Auckland